Collateral valuation adjustment (ColVA) or appraisal subordination entitlement reduction (ASER) are commercial mortgage-backed security structuring innovations designed to improve overall transaction credit quality. Collateral valuation adjustments were created in response to rating agency concerns that, without such an adjustment,  cash flow from mortgage loans likely to default would be paid to the first-loss class. The rationale behind appraisal reductions is to support proactively the credit rating of senior CMBS tranches by reducing cash-flow payments to the subordinate tranches.

See also
Real estate mortgage investment conduit
Commercial mortgage-backed security
Residential mortgage-backed security
 Collateral Appraisal

Mortgage industry of the United States